Conway House, also known as the Moncure Daniel Conway House, is a historic home located at Falmouth, Stafford County, Virginia. It was the home of author, clergyman, and abolitionist Moncure D. Conway (1832-1907) and used as a Union hospital during the American Civil War.

The home was built in 1807, and is a large two-story, five bay, "L"-shaped Federal style brick dwelling.  It has a full basement, side-gable slate roof, brick interior-end chimneys.

It was listed on the National Register of Historic Places in 2004. In 2005, the National Park Service formally recognized the home as a National Underground Railroad Network to Freedom Historical Site. It is located in the Falmouth Historic District.

References

External links
Fredericksburg, Stafford, Spotsylvania Historical Markers: Moncure Daniel Conway N-36
Conway House, from Stafford County Museum

Houses on the National Register of Historic Places in Virginia
Federal architecture in Virginia
Houses completed in 1807
National Register of Historic Places in Stafford County, Virginia
Houses in Stafford County, Virginia
Individually listed contributing properties to historic districts on the National Register in Virginia
Moncure family